{{DISPLAYTITLE:C10H14N2O4}}
The molecular formula C10H14N2O4 (molar mass: 226.23 g/mol, exact mass: 226.0954 u) may refer to:

 Carbidopa
 2C-N
 Porphobilinogen
 Proxibarbital
 Valofane